Küzholüzo Nienü popularly known as Azo Nienü is an Indian politician from Nagaland. He was elected to Nagaland Legislative Assembly 4 times from Phek Assembly constituency in 2003, 2008, 2013 and 2018 Nagaland Legislative Assembly election. He has earlier served as a minister in Nagaland Legislative Assembly. Nienu is currently the Leader of Naga People's Front Legislature wing and is the Co Chairman of United Democratic Alliance government in Nagaland Legislative Assembly.

References 

1966 births
Naga people
People from Kohima
Living people
North-Eastern Hill University alumni
Nagaland MLAs 2003–2008
Nagaland MLAs 2008–2013
Nagaland MLAs 2013–2018
Nagaland MLAs 2018–2023
Nagaland MLAs 2023–2028